The fifth and final season of Dynasty, an American television series based on the 1980s prime time soap opera of the same name, premiered in the United States on The CW on December 20, 2021. The series was renewed for a fifth season on February 3, 2021. It was announced in May 2022 that the fifth season of Dynasty would be its last.

Season five stars Elizabeth Gillies as Fallon Carrington, Grant Show as her father Blake Carrington, Daniella Alonso as Blake's wife Cristal, Sam Underwood as Fallon's brother Adam Carrington, and Eliza Bennett as her younger sister Amanda Carrington, with Robert Christopher Riley as Michael Culhane; Sam Adegoke as Jeff Colby; Rafael de la Fuente as Sam Jones; Adam Huber as Liam Ridley; Maddison Brown as Kirby Anders; Michael Michele as Dominique Deveraux; and Elaine Hendrix as Alexis Carrington Colby. Notable recurring characters include Geovanni Gopradi as Roberto "Beto" Flores; Rogelio T. Ramos as Daniel Ruiz; Pej Vahdat as Dex Dexter; and Brett Tucker as Ben Carrington. Alonso also plays the recurring role of Rita, and James Mackay returns as Steven Carrington.

Cast and characters

Main 
 Elizabeth Gillies as Fallon Carrington, an heiress and businesswoman, daughter of billionaire Blake Carrington and his first wife Alexis, and married to Liam
 Hanna Ciubotaru portrays young Fallon 
 Daniella Alonso as Cristal Jennings Carrington, Blake's third wife and the CEO of Flores Incorporado
 Alonso was also given an end credits billing for playing Rita, a Cristal lookalike in league with Beto 
 Elaine Hendrix as Alexis Carrington Colby Dexter, ex-wife of Blake and Jeff, new wife of Dex, mother of Adam, Steven, Fallon and Amanda
 Rafael de La Fuente as Samuel Josiah "Sammy Jo" Jones Carrington, Steven Carrington's ex-husband, owner of the La Mirage Hotel
 Sam Underwood as Adam Carrington, Blake and Alexis's eldest son, a doctor
 Michael Michele as Dominique Deveraux, Jeff's mother, Blake's half-sister, owner of fashion brand Dom-Mystique
 Robert Christopher Riley as Michael Culhane, former Carrington chauffeur, now co-owner of La Mirage with Sam
 Sam Adegoke as Jeff Colby, Dominique's son and Blake's nephew, a billionaire tech genius
 Maddison Brown as Kirby Anders, daughter of the late Carrington majordomo, Joseph Anders, a model
 Adam Huber as Liam Ridley, a writer married to Fallon
 Eliza Bennett as Amanda Carrington, Alexis's youngest daughter by Blake, a lawyer from the UK
 Grant Show as Blake Carrington, billionaire and the father of Adam, Fallon and Amanda by his first wife, Alexis
 Jax Buresh portrays teenage Blake.

Recurring

 Geovanni Gopradi as Roberto "Beto" Flores, Cristal's vengeful brother 
 Rogelio T. Ramos as Daniel Ruiz, a horse trainer who is Sam's biological father 
 Pej Vahdat as Dex Dexter, a hedge fund manager who marries Alexis
 Cynthia Quiles as Charlie Jiménez, a talent agent who signs and romances Kirby 
 Felisha Terrell as Nina Fournier, an up and coming independent filmmaker 
 Brett Tucker as Ben Carrington, Blake's estranged brother 
 Townsend Fallica portrays Ben as a boy 
 Samantha Massell as Stacey Moore, a paleontologist who is Fallon and Liam's surrogate 
 Grace Junot as Ellen, a board member of Fallon Unlimited

Guest
 Kara Royster as Eva, Fallon's incarcerated former assistant 
 Randy J. Goodwin as Brady Lloyd, Dominique's ex-husband 
 Arnetia Walker as Louella Culhane, Michael's mother 
 Kate Kneeland as Betty, Fallon's new assistant 
 Carson Fagerbakke as Patricia "Patty" De Vilbis, longtime nemesis of Fallon's from the equestrian circuit 
 Bill Fagerbakke as Peter De Vilbis, Patty's oil baron father 
 Daniela Lee as Jeanette, a Carrington maid 
 Lara Silva as Luna, a terminally-ill friend of Jeff's 
 Yvonna Pearson as Sasha Harris, a model friend of Kirby's 
 Daphne Zuniga as Sonya Jackson, a college friend of Blake's 
 Elena Tovar as Iris Machado, Sam's mother 
 Scott Daniel Johnson as Richard Payne, CEO of Plenexia Pharmaceuticals and Jeff's foe 
 Sharon Lawrence as Laura Van Kirk, Liam's rich, controlling mother 
 Brianna Brown as Claudia Blaisdel, the parolee who killed Blake's second wife, Cristal/Celia 
 Tetona Jackson as Frankie Chase, a singer Fallon wants to join her company 
 David Diaan as Samir Dexter, Dex's father 
 Angeria Paris van Michaels as Herself 
 Danny Nucci as Professor Kingston, Liam's mentor 
 Walker Russell as Jasper, Kingston's unscrupulous nephew  
 Carly Hughes as Geneva Abbott, the widow of Sam and Michael's late contractor Leo Abbott 
 Charisma Carpenter as Heather, Fallon's former nanny with whom Blake had an affair 
 Henry Simmons as Kevin, Dominique's bodyguard 
 Amy Pietz as Mandy Von Dunkel, an Atlanta dilettante 
 Matt Bennett as Cole, a bachelor who takes part in Fallon's auction 
 Ashley B. Jones as Gemma, a sexy spy for Plenexia 
 Lachlan Buchanan as Ryan, Sam's ex-boyfriend 
 Kate Beahan as Florence Whitley, a British judge and Amanda's ex-girlfriend 
 Natalie Karp as Mrs. Gunnerson, the Carrington cook 
 James Mackay as Steven Carrington, Fallon's gay, environmentalist half-brother 
 Steve Spoon as young Steven 
 Dan Amboyer as Graham, a candidate to replace Anders as Carrington majordomo who is actually Steven in disguise

Episodes

Production

Development
Ahead of the season four premiere on The CW, Dynasty was renewed for a fifth season on February 3, 2021. The CW President and CEO Mark Pedowitz stated in a press release, "Though we’re just a few weeks into the new season, we wanted to get a strategic head start on next season with these early renewals, which allows our production teams to start laying out story arcs and hiring staff, and at the same time, continues to provide us with a strong, stable schedule to build on for next season."

Season five will consist of 22 episodes. It was announced in May 2022 that the fifth season of Dynasty would be its last.

Casting

In August 2021, Eliza Bennett was cast as Amanda Carrington in a recurring role for season four, to become a series regular in season five. In January 2022, it was reported that Pej Vahdat had been cast as Dex Dexter for season five. In April 2022, Variety reported that Grant Show's former Melrose Place castmate Daphne Zuniga would appear on Dynasty as Sonya Jackson, a college friend of Blake's, debuting in the episode "A Friendly Kiss Between Friends". In May 2022, TVLine reported that Charisma Carpenter would guest star in the seventeenth episode as Fallon's former nanny, Heather.

Filming 
Filming for the fifth season began on October 21, 2021, and concluded in August 2022.

Broadcast
The fifth season premiered with two episodes on Monday, December 20, 2021, and then returned to Fridays on March 11, 2022.

Reception

References

External links 
 
 

Dynasty (2017 TV series) seasons
2021 American television seasons
2022 American television seasons